Hakan Yeşil (born 1 January 2002) is a Turkish professional footballer who plays as a midfielder for Turkish club Bodrumspor on loan from Trabzonspor.

Career
Yeşil is a youth product of Trabzonspor's academy. He signed his first professional contract with the club in 2019. He went on a short loan to 1461 Trabzon in January 2019. He made his professional debut with Trabzonspor in a 2–1 Süper Lig win over Gençlerbirliği on 15 May 2021.

On 20 January 2023, Yeşil joined Bodrumspor on loan.

International career
Yeşil is a youth international for Turkey, having represented their youth sides 48 times. He was appointed the captain of the Turkey U19s.

Personal life
Yeşil is the cousin of the Turkish footballer Mehmet Yeşil.

Honours
Turkey U23
Islamic Solidarity Games: 2021

References

External links

2002 births
People from Ergani
Living people
Turkish footballers
Turkey youth international footballers
Association football midfielders
Trabzonspor footballers
1461 Trabzon footballers
Adanaspor footballers
Süper Lig players
TFF First League players
TFF Second League players
TFF Third League players